Southern Pines is a town in Moore County, North Carolina, United States. The population was 12,334 as of the 2010 United States Census.

History
Southern Pines was founded as a winter health resort for Northerners. As of 1898, it was a sundown town where African Americans were not allowed to reside or conduct business.

The James Boyd House, Shaw House, Southern Pines Historic District, Firleigh Farms, and Moore County Hunt Lands and Mile-Away Farms are listed on the National Register of Historic Places. The Southern Pines Golf Club was founded in 1906.

Geography
According to the United States Census Bureau, the town has a total area of 15.5 square miles (40.2 km), of which 15.4 square miles (39.8 km) is land and 0.2 square mile (0.5 km) (1.16%) is water.

Demographics

2020 census

As of the 2020 United States census, there were 15,545 people, 6,321 households, and 3,505 families residing in the town.

2010 census
As of the 2010 census, there were 12,334 people, 5,866 households, and 3,304 families residing in the town. The population density was 806 people per square mile (311.2/km). There were 6,859 housing units at an average density of 371 houses/condos per square mile (143.24/km). The racial makeup of the town was 71.7% White, 24% African American, 0.6% Native American, 0.8% Asian, 0.1% Pacific Islander, 1.3% from other races, and 1.4% from two or more races. Hispanic or Latino of any race were 1.4% of the population.

Of the 5,866 households, 21% had children under the age of 18 living with them, 40.6% were married couples living together, 13% had a female householder with no husband present, 2.7 had a male householder with no female present, and 38.9% were non-families. The average household size was 2.07 and the average family size was 2.75.

In the town, the population was spread out, with 21.9% aged 19 and younger, 4.7% from 20 to 24, 20.8% from 25 to 44, 25.2% from 45 to 64, and 27.5% who were 65 years of age or older. The median age was 47. For every 100 females, there were 82 males. For every 100 females age 18 and over, there were 78.2 males.

The median income for a household in the town was $41,297 in 2011, and the median income for a family was $60,683. Males had a median income of $29,855 versus $23,920 for females. The per capita income for the town was $30,886. Of families, 9.26% were below the poverty level, along with 12.4% of the population poverty line, including 23.0% of those under age 18 and 9.6% of those age 65 or over.

Education
 The O'Neal School
 Pinecrest High School
 St. John Paul II Catholic School
 Episcopal Day School
 Sandhills Classical Christian School
 Academy of Classical Design - Fine Art Atelier
 Calvary Christian School
 Moore Montessori Community School 
Sandhills Community College
North Moore High School
Union Pines High School

Media
The Pilot (fka The Southern Pines Pilot)
PineStraw Magazine
 WYBE Sandhills Lifetime TV 44
 WEEB Talk Radio 990 AM and 97.3 FM
 WIOZ Star 102.5 FM
 WMGU Magic 106.9 FM
 WMAG 99.5 Winston-Salem, Greensboro, High-Point
 WQSM 98.1 Q98 Fayetteville
The metro area has TV broadcasting stations that serve the Raleigh-Durham Designated Market Area (DMA) as defined by Nielsen Media Research.

Infrastructure

Transportation
 Southern Pines (Amtrak station)
 Moore County Airport

Notable people

 James Baldwin — former All-Star pitcher for the Chicago White Sox
PT Barnum — built a home for his family in Southern Pines at 285 N. Bethesda Rd. 
 Peggy Kirk Bell – golf instructor, and founding member of the LPGA
 Jeff Capel II - An American National Basketball Association assistant coach and a college basketball head coach
 Bobby Collins — college basketball coach
 Sarah Dessen – New York Times bestseller author
 Denny Emerson - An American equestrian
 Charlie Engle — ultramarathon runner and author
 Augustus M. Gurney- United States general officer who retired here 
 James Holshouser, Jr. – former Republican Governor of North Carolina
 Sandy Koufax – Hall of Fame pitcher for the Los Angeles Dodgers formerly owned a home in Southern Pines
 Julien J. LeBourgeois — former vice admiral of the United States Navy
 Carwood Lipton — member 101st Airborne Division in World War II, portrayed in Band of Brothers, spent his retirement years in Southern Pines
 James Russell McGregor (James 3X Shabazz), a leader of the Nation of Islam and an associate of Malcolm X
 Armelia McQueen - actress
 Jeffrey Mims – artist, and founder of Academy of Classical Design
 Shannon Moore – professional wrestler
 Richard T. Morgan — North Carolina state legislator, businessman, and farmer
 Winant Sidle – U.S. Army Major General
 John Frank Stevens – railroad builder, discoverer of Stevens Pass, and lead engineer for the Panama Canal
 Michael Walsh — Horse Trainer and founder of the Stoneybrook Steeplechase, National Horse Racing Hall of Fame inductee
 Toni Lynn Washington — blues singer

Sister city
Southern Pines has one sister city, as designated by Sister Cities International:
 Newry/Mourne, County Down, Northern Ireland, United Kingdom

References

External links
 Town of Southern Pines
 Moore County Chamber of Commerce

Towns in North Carolina
Towns in Moore County, North Carolina
Sandhills (Carolina)
Sundown towns in North Carolina